Satinette may refer to: 
 Satinet, a finely woven fabric
 a variation of the Oriental Frill, a breed of fancy pigeons